The Baltimore City Passenger Railway began operation on July 12, 1859 using horse-drawn cars.

Oden Bowie was elected president of the railroad in 1873.

Remaining Structures
Baltimore City Passenger Railway Power House and Car Barn, 1711-1719 North Charles Street, Baltimore, Maryland 21201, built in 1892
Baltimore City Passenger Railway cable powerhouse, 1100 East Baltimore Street, Baltimore, Maryland 21202, built in 1892

See also 
 Baltimore Streetcar Museum
 History of MTA Maryland
 United Railways and Electric Company

References

Defunct Maryland railroads
5 ft 4½ in gauge railways